Tuba Ünsal (born 7 December 1981) is  a Turkish actress and model.

Biography
Tuba Ünsal was born in Denizli on 7 December 1981. Her paternal family, who are of Turkish origin, emigrated from Greece. Other part of her maternal family is  Oghuz Turk immigrant from Bulgaria. Other part of her maternal family is Kazan Tatar which a Turkic subgroup immigrated from  Romania. She studied business administration in Çanakkale Onsekiz Mart University. Ünsal graduated from the photography and video department of Istanbul Bilgi University.

She began her modelling career by contesting in the 1998 Elite Model look. She was featured in a variety of commercials and advertising campaigns before pursuing a career in acting. Among her notable film roles are Tuba Sernikli in the 2004 comedy-drama Vizontele Tuuba, Özlem in Cool School, Zeynep Nehir in Plajda, and Sinem in Çakallarla Dans. Ünsal was also cast in the 2008 film A Beautiful Life.

Since her debut, she has acted in numerous television series, including Mahallenin Muhtarları, Ruhsar, Kara Melek, Çarli İş Başında, Karaoğlan, and Öyle Bir Geçer Zaman ki.

Filmography

References

External links

1981 births
Living people
Turkish film actresses
Turkish television actresses
Turkish female models
People from Denizli
20th-century Turkish actresses
Çanakkale Onsekiz Mart University people